Military eagles are military insignia used in the Polish Armed Forces, based on the White Eagle of the Polish coat of arms. They are used on elements of military uniforms such as hats and buttons, as well as on military banners, flags, medals, emblems, publications etc. One variant exists for each of the five branches of the Armed Forces. Additionally, the Minister of National Defence, the Marshal of Poland, and generals and admirals use their own variants. 

The Polish People's Army used a similar emblems below but without the crown.

See also
Order of the White Eagle

References

External links 
 
 

 

Military symbols
National symbols of Poland